Lawrence E. Schovanec (born November 14, 1952) is an American mathematician and academic administrator and the current President of Texas Tech University. He began his career in academia at Texas Tech in 1982, and has served the institution as president since August 1, 2016. Schovanec earned his bachelor's degree from Phillips University, a master's degree from Texas A&M University, and a Ph.D in mathematics from Indiana University.

Schovanec is originally from Oklahoma, where he was raised on a farm. He has two sons.

References

External links

1952 births
Living people
Presidents of Texas Tech University
Texas Tech University faculty
Phillips University alumni
Texas A&M University alumni
Indiana University alumni
20th-century American mathematicians
21st-century American mathematicians
Place of birth missing (living people)